This is the first edition of the tournament.
Tímea Babos and Anne Kremer won the tournament after defeating Marta Domachowska and Katarzyna Piter 7–6(5), 6–2 in the final.

Seeds

  Sandra Klemenschits /  Irena Pavlovic (second round)
  Emma Laine /  Melanie South (second round)
  Claudia Giovine /  Marta Sirotkina (semifinals)
  Irini Georgatou /  Liana Ungur (second round)

Draw

Draw

External links
 Main Draw

Aegon GB Pro-Series Bath - Women's Doubles
2011 Women's Doubles